ZJN may refer to:

 ZJN, the IATA code for Swan River Airport, Manitoba, Canada
 ZJN, the Pinyin code for Zhenjiang South railway station, Jiangsu, China